Marijan Kovačević (born 31 August 1973) is a German-Croatian former footballer.

Club career
He played for German clubs like Hamburger SV, VfL Wolfsburg, MSV Duisburg and SSV Jahn Regensburg, Austrian club Admira Wacker Mödling, Cypriot club Enosis Neon Paralimni FC, Portuguese club União da Madeira and Bosnian and Herzegovian club Široki Brijeg.

References

External links
 Marijan Kovačević at worldfootball.net
 
 

1973 births
Living people
Footballers from Hamburg
German people of Croatian descent
Association football midfielders
German footballers
Croatian footballers
Hamburger SV players
Hamburger SV II players
VfL Wolfsburg players
MSV Duisburg players
NK Široki Brijeg players
C.F. União players
SSV Jahn Regensburg players
FC Admira Wacker Mödling players
Enosis Neon Paralimni FC players
VfB Stuttgart players
VfB Stuttgart II players
Bundesliga players
2. Bundesliga players
3. Liga players
Premier League of Bosnia and Herzegovina players
Liga Portugal 2 players
Cypriot First Division players
Austrian Football Bundesliga players
Croatian expatriate footballers
Expatriate footballers in Bosnia and Herzegovina
Croatian expatriate sportspeople in Bosnia and Herzegovina
Expatriate footballers in Portugal
German expatriate sportspeople in Portugal
Croatian expatriate sportspeople in Portugal
Expatriate footballers in Austria
Croatian expatriate sportspeople in Austria
Expatriate footballers in Cyprus
Croatian expatriate sportspeople in Cyprus
West German footballers